Coledale is a valley in the northwestern region of the Lake District in Cumbria, England.

Geography
Coledale is a narrow U-shaped valley running approximately north-east towards the Derwent Valley floodplain and the village of Braithwaite at the northeastern end. The valley river Coledale Beck feeds into Newlands Beck and is fed by small streams from the valley sides and head, including Birkthwaite Beck, and Pudding Force.

At the head of the valley a large rock formation is found named Force Crag, which forms a waterfall 'Low Force' as Pudding Beck passes over it.

The valley is ringed by peaks popular with tourists (Grisedale Pike, Hopegill Head, Coledale Hause, Crag Hill (formerly Eel Crag), Sail, Sail Pass, and Outerside) forming a horseshoe ridge walk known as Coledale horseshoe or 'Coledale round'.

Force Crag Mine

Coledale's most notable feature is Force Crag Mine; the buildings, spoil heap and associated structures of which are practically the only sign of human influence in the upper valley.

Mineral workings may date back to 1578 in the valley Significant workings did not begin until the 1800s with lead and silver being mined until 1865, ending with a drop in the price of lead rendering it uneconomic. Later Barytes was mined, with 5300tons of ore being produced up to 1879 when again market forces led to production ending. The mine was worked on and off with various changes in operation, and under different owners, with lead, barium and zinc ores being extracted. In 1990 a collapse in the mine led to it being closed, and ownership passed to the National Trust.

There were two workings of the mine, the low and high, and as of 2015 the mill of the mine still stood. The building is a Scheduled ancient monument and the mine is a site of special scientific interest. The buildings can now be visited by appointment through the national trust.

As well as an aerial ropeway for transporting ore to the mill built in the late 1930s the mine also operated a small narrow gauge railway in the mine, utilising diesel and battery powered locomotives, one of which (Wingrove & Rogers Battery loco) is now at the Springfield Agricultural Railway, three 2 ft gauge wagons from the mine are to be found at the Moseley museum in Redruth Cornwall.

References

Further reading
  (Out of print.)

External links 

Force crag Mine, Images from inside the mine, www.mine-explorer.co.uk
Diagram of Force Crag Mine levels and workings aditnow.co.uk
Force Crag Mine detailed history forlornbritain.co.uk
Park and Stride - Eel Crag from Braithwaite, Coledale horseshoe walk and history of mine,  www.bbc.co.uk
Force Crag Mine information, opening times at the National Trust

Valleys of Cumbria
Lake District